Karen Bertelsen  is a Canadian television personality and blogger, known for hosting various programs, including HGTV Canada's Superstar-styled shows, Handyman Superstar Challenge, Designer Superstar Challenge and Slice Network's Superstar Hair Challenge.

Karen was born in Hamilton, Ontario, Canada. She attended Parkside High School and received a Bachelor's degree in Sociology from McMaster University in Canada.

Bertelsen began her career on the local community channel Cable 14 in Hamilton, and then moved to CFMT.

Bertelsen was also a personality for MuchMoreMusic, the W Expert Challenge and the lifestyle show Playing House, both for Canada's W Network. She was nominated for a Gemini Award in the hosting category for the W Network makeover show Stylin' Gypsies.

Bertelsen is the founder of the lifestyle blog "The Art of Doing Stuff".

References

External links

HGTV Canada info page
The Art of Doing Stuff

Participants in Canadian reality television series
Canadian women bloggers
Canadian bloggers
Actresses from Toronto
Living people
Canadian people of Danish descent
Year of birth missing (living people)